Dávid Fekete (born 12 October 1996) is a Hungarian handball player for Budakalász FKC and the Hungarian national team.

He participated at the 2018 European Men's Handball Championship.

Honours

Individual
 Hungarian Adolescent Handballer of the Year: 2012

References

1996 births
Living people
Handball players from Budapest
Hungarian male handball players
Veszprém KC players
20th-century Hungarian people
21st-century Hungarian people